Marcela Lobo Pérez (born 18 May 1984) is a Mexican equestrian. She competed in two events at the 2004 Summer Olympics.

References

1984 births
Living people
Mexican female equestrians
Olympic equestrians of Mexico
Equestrians at the 2004 Summer Olympics
Sportspeople from Monterrey